Varsity Theater or Varsity Theatre may refer to:

Varsity Theater in Dinkytown, Minneapolis, Minnesota
Varsity Theatre (Martin, Tennessee)
The Blue Note (Columbia, Missouri), formerly called Varsity Theatre
Varsity Theatre (Palo Alto)

See also
 Varsity (disambiguation)